Gourab Chatterjee is an Indian film and television actor based in Kolkata. He is the grandson of Uttam Kumar.

Career 
His debut film, Bhalobasar Onek Naam (2006), was directed by film director Tarun Majumdar and co-starred Soumitra Chatterjee and Moushumi Chatterjee.

Filmography

Films 
Oti Uttam (Upcoming)
 Mayaa (Upcoming)
Kojagori (Upcoming)
 Kirtan (Upcoming)
 Ghore Pherar Gaan
Circus er Ghora
Baba Baby O (2022)
Ekti Bangali Alien-er Golpo (Zee Bangla Cinema Originals) (2021)
Aloukik Obhijaan (Zee Bangla Cinema Originals) (2021)
 Ke Tumi Nandini (2019)
 Pather Sesh Kothay (2012)
 Rang Milanti (2010)
 Eti (2008)
 Krishnakanter Will (2007)
 Bhalobasar Anek Naam (2006)

Television 
 Durga as Rupam (Star Jalsha) (2008–2010)
 Ghore Pherar Gaan as Rick Banerjee (Star Jalsha) (2012–2013)
 Bodhuboron as Satyaki Chowdhury (Star Jalsha) (2013–2017)
 Adorini as Rayan Sen (Star Jalsha) (2017–2018)
 Karunamoyee Rani Rashmoni as Mathuramohan Biswas Zee Bangla (2018–2021)
Lockdown Diary - Honeymoon (Zee Bangla) (2020)

 Mahapeeth Tarapeeth as Rabindranath Tagore (Star Jalsha) (2021)
Gaatchora as Riddhiman Singha Roy (Star Jalsha) (2022)

Web series
hoichoi
 Charitraheen (29th Sep 2018)
 Do Not Disturb (8th Dec 2018)
 Shei je Holud Pakhi(2018)
 Bou Keno Psycho (21st Feb 2019)
 Bonno Premer Golpo (2020)
 Shei je Holud Pakhi-Season 2(2021)

References 

Living people
Year of birth missing (living people)
Male actors in Bengali cinema
21st-century Indian male actors
Indian television actors
Bengali television actors
gourab chatterjee age, biography, height, movies & tv show